Sphecodina is a genus of moths in the family Sphingidae first described by Émile Blanchard in 1840.

Species
Sphecodina abbottii (Swainson, 1821)
Sphecodina caudata (Bremer & Grey, 1853)

References

Macroglossini
Moth genera
Taxa named by Émile Blanchard